Charles Peters (born December 22, 1926) is an American journalist, editor, and author. He was the founder and editor-in-chief of the Washington Monthly magazine and the author of We Do Our Part: Toward A Fairer and More Equal America (Random House, 2017). Writing in The New York Times, Jonathan Martin called the book a “well timed … cri de coeur” and “a desperate plea to his country and party to resist the temptations of greed, materialism and elitism.”

Early life and education 
Charles Peters was born in December 1926 in Charleston, West Virginia. He attended public schools, graduating from Charleston High School in 1944. He enlisted in the U.S. Army in 1944, serving at Ohio University, Camp Atterbury in Indiana, and Fort McClellan, Alabama, where an injury in a training accident resulted in his being in Army hospitals for several months, and his discharge from the Army in 1946.

In 1946, he went to New York City to enter Columbia College. After receiving his BA in 1949, he entered graduate school at Columbia and received his MA. in 1951. In 1952–53, he worked for the J. Walter Thompson advertising agency in New York. During the summers from 1946 through 1954, he performed various backstage roles at summer theaters in Boylston, Massachusetts, Bucks County, Pennsylvania, and Newport, Rhode Island, and had his own repertory company in Charleston, West Virginia.

Peters entered the University of Virginia School of Law in 1954. He was named to the editorial board of the Virginia Law Review in 1955, serving until his graduation with a JD in 1957.

Early career 
After law school, he married Elizabeth Hubbell, a former ballet dancer who had attended Vassar College, and returned to Charleston to practice law with his father's firm, Peters, Merricks, Leslie and Mohler. His practice included libel, criminal defense, corporate and labor law, as well as representing plaintiffs and defendants in civil trials.

In 1959, he was named chief staff officer of the Judiciary Committee of the West Virginia House of Delegates, and in 1960, he was elected a member of the House. In 1960, he also managed the primary and general election campaigns in Kanawha County for presidential candidate John F. Kennedy. After serving in the 1961 session of the legislature, he went to Washington, D.C., to help start the Peace Corps. After returning to serve in the 1962 legislative session, he was named the Peace Corps’ director of evaluation, a position that required him to report on the performance of the agency's programs overseas and on how they could be improved.

Founding of the Washington Monthly 
In 1968, Peters resigned from the Peace Corps to begin planning a new magazine to be called the Washington Monthly.

The magazine's prospectus said its purpose would be “to look at Washington the way an anthropologist looks at a South Sea island,” helping the reader understand our system of politics and government, where it breaks down, why it breaks down, and what can be done to make it work.” The first issue was published in January 1969. Its articles included “The White House Staff vs. the Cabinet,” “What Happens to a Senator’s Day,” and “The Data Game.” Among the authors were such journalists as David Broder, Murray Kempton, Russell Baker, and Calvin Trillin, as well as people who had worked in government, such as Peters, former White House aide Bill Moyers, and former U.S. Senate aide James Boyd. A similar mix of authors would continue to write for the magazine, but beginning in 1970, the magazine became largely the product of young unknowns, who would typically serve as writer-editors for two years. Among them were Taylor Branch, Suzannah Lessard, James Fallows, Walter Shapiro, Michael Kinsley, David Ignatius, Nicholas Lemann, Gregg Easterbrook, Mickey Kaus, Joe Nocera, Jonathan Alter, Timothy Noah, Steve Waldman, Matt Cooper, Jason DeParle, James Bennet, Katherine Boo, and Jon Meacham. One author characterizes Peters and the magazine as important influences on radical centrist political thought.

Peters served as editor of the Washington Monthly until he retired in 2001, but continued to write a regular column Tilting at Windmills for the magazine until 2014. Russell Baker, in an interview in the alumni magazine Columbia College Today, called Peters “a great editor in an age that’s not producing great editors.”

Founding of Understanding Government 
In 1998, he founded a non-profit organization called Understanding Government with the purpose of improving press coverage of the executive branch of government.  Understanding Government sponsored the first-ever Prize for Preventive Journalism, given in 2008 to journalist Michael Grunwald, and has published reports on federal agencies including the Federal Bureau of Investigation, the Federal Aviation Administration, and the Consumer Product Safety Commission. Peters retired from the nonprofit in 2012, and it ceased operations in 2014.

Books 
Author
We Do Our Part: Toward a Fairer and More Equal America
Lyndon B. Johnson
Five Days in Philadelphia: The Amazing 'We Want Willkie!' Convention of 1940 and How It Freed FDR to Save the Western World
How Washington Really Works
Tilting At Windmills: An Autobiography

Co-editor
Blowing the Whistle (with Taylor Branch)
The System (with James Fallows)
The Culture of Bureaucracy (with Michael Nelson)
A New Road for America:  the Neoliberal Movement (with Phil Keisling)
Inside the System (with Timothy Adams – first ed.; with John Rothchild – second ed.; with James Fallows – third ed.; with Nicholas Lemann – fourth ed.; with Jonathan Alter – fifth ed.)

Articles 
A Neoliberal's Manifesto

Awards 

Peters was named the recipient of the first Richard M. Clurman Award in 1996 for his work mentoring young journalists. He also received the Columbia Journalism Award in 1978 and was a Poynter Fellow at Yale University in 1980, the Delacorte Lecturer at the Graduate School of Journalism at Columbia University in 1990 and 2003 and visiting fellow at the Hoover Institution at Stanford University in 1994. In 2001, he was elected to the Hall of Fame of the American Society of Magazine Editors and the Hall of Fame of the D.C. Society of Professional Journalists. In 2002 he was the Times Mirror David M. Laventhol Visiting Professor at Columbia University's Graduate School of Journalism. In 2003, he received the Carr Van Anda Award from the E. W. Scripps School of Journalism, Ohio University. He was a Public Scholar at the Woodrow Wilson International Center for Scholars, September 2002 through April 2003.

References

External links
The West Virginia & Regional History Center at West Virginia University houses the Charles Peters papers within the Distinguished West Virginians Archive
Tilting at Windmills listing 
Washington Monthly bio
Understanding Government bio
The Political Graveyard
How Washington Really Works (documentary about Charles Peters and the Washington Monthly)

1926 births
Living people
American biographers
American columnists
American male journalists
American magazine editors
American political writers
Charleston High School (West Virginia) alumni
Columbia College (New York) alumni
Journalists from West Virginia
Lawyers from Charleston, West Virginia
Radical centrist writers
United States Army soldiers
University of Virginia School of Law alumni
West Virginia Democrats
West Virginia lawyers
Writers from Charleston, West Virginia
American male biographers
United States Army personnel of World War II